Maxine Lee Bahns (born February 28, 1971) is an American actress, triathlete, and model. She is best known for roles in the films The Brothers McMullen and  She's the One, appearing in both as the love interest of her then-boyfriend, Edward Burns, who directed both films.  She also appeared, uncredited, as the murdered wife of the protagonist of the television show The Mentalist.

Early life
Bahns was born in Vermont; the family later moved to Long Island. Her father is German-American and her mother was born in Hong Kong of mixed Chinese and Brazilian descent. She has one sister, Brandy de St Phalle. At age 16, Bahns traveled to Barcelona, Valencia, Paris, and Rome. After returning to New York, she attended New York University, majoring in Latin and Greek language and literature, considering a PhD in classics.

Career
Bahns attended acting classes at the Beverly Hills Playhouse taught by Milton Katselas and also studied with Ivana Chubbuck. Her big break came when Edward Burns asked her to star in his low-budget film The Brothers McMullen. In 1996, she co-starred in She's the One opposite Burns, marking the couple's last collaboration before their split. In 1997, she made her television debut on the HBO science-fiction/horror series Perversions of Science, guest-starring in the episode "People's Choice". She starred in the 1998 film Chick Flick.

In 2000, she co-starred in the made-for-television movie Cutaway opposite actor Tom Berenger, and in three films: the crime/thriller Dangerous Curves opposite actors Robert Carradine and David Carradine; the comedy/drama Vice opposite Bo Hopkins; and the comedy Spin Cycle opposite actress Sarah Chalke. The following year, she co-starred in the film The Elite opposite actor Jurgen Prochnow. In 2005, she was in the direct-to-video horror film Scarred, and guest-starred on an episode of CBS's mystery/drama series CSI: NY episode "Dancing with the Fishes".

In 2007, she co-starred in the drama film Steam opposite actresses Ruby Dee, Ally Sheedy, and Kate Siegel; she also made two guest appearances on television: FOX's legal drama Justice episode "False Confession", and NBC's comedy/drama series Studio 60 on the Sunset Strip for two episode. In 2008, Bahns co-starred in the horror/thriller film Conjurer opposite actor Andrew Bowen. That same year, she made an uncredited appearance as Simon Baker's murdered wife Angela Ruskin-Jane on CBS's The Mentalist.

Bahns returned to the silver screen in 2009, in the drama Stellina Blue, opposite actress Christina Mauro; the crime/drama-thriller The Hitmen Diaries: Charlie Valentine, starring Raymond J. Barry; and in the adventure/horror-thriller The Lost Tribe starring Emily Baldoni. In 2010, she co-starred in the film What Would Jesus Do? opposite John Schneider, and made a guest appearance in the  "Money for Nothing" episode of TNT's police procedural/crime-drama series Rizzoli & Isles.

In 2011, she appeared in the comedy film Naked Run starring actor Charles Durning, and made an uncredited guest appearance on the NBC police procedural/legal drama Law & Order: LA episode "Silver Lake". In 2012, she co-starred in the comedy/drama romance film Driving Me Crazy opposite actor Keith Black. She did not return to acting until 2017, when she appeared in the drama film Web Cam Girls starring actress Arianne Zucker. In 2018, she made a guest appearance on the Amazon Video crime/drama-thriller series Too Old to Die Young.

Bahns has also been involved in modelling, working for the Elite Model Management. During her time as a model, she appeared in numerous magazines including FHM, Sports Illustrated for Women, Self, Glamour, and Maxim.

Personal life

In 2001, after moving to Los Angeles, Bahns became involved in triathlons and completed the Ironman Triathlon that year. She has  competed in a number of triathlons, such as the Wildflower ½ Ironman and the Keauhou ½ Ironman. She has appeared on the covers of Runner's World, Triathlete and FIT!.

From October 5, 2003 to November 2006, she was married to Peter Crone, who appeared as Nikos in Music Within. On October 13, 2007, Bahns married Patrick Watson; they reside in Los Angeles with their two daughters, Madison Rose and Harper Lee.

Filmography

Film

Television

References

External links

1971 births
Living people
People from Stowe, Vermont
American people of German descent
American people of Brazilian descent
American people of Hong Kong descent
American actresses of Chinese descent
American film actresses
American television actresses
American female triathletes
Actresses of Brazilian descent
Actresses from Vermont
Female models from Vermont
New York University alumni
20th-century American actresses
21st-century American actresses